The Resident Patient is the third album by emcee/producer and Wu-Tang Clan member Inspectah Deck. Originally put out as a mixtape, its status as an official release is somewhat contested, and it is now generally considered a "street album"—an informal album released somewhat under the radar. It was also meant to be a prelude to his album The Rebellion; however, since its release, Deck has announced that The Resident Patient 2 will be coming ahead of The Rebellion, which will be his final album.

The Resident Patient features production from largely underground artists Flowers Productions, Live Son, The Marksmen, Concrete Beats and Yak Ballz producer Mondee, as well as The Beatnuts member Psycho Les, Wu-Tang affiliate Cilvaringz, and Deck himself. Guesting are Masta Killa and U-God of the core Wu-Tang Clan, as well as Deck's loosely defined Housegang crew; here, they consist of La Banga, Carlton Fisk, Hugh Hef, and Donnie Cash. The record's sound is underground, with a more New York bent than traditional Wu-Tang releases, though some tracks—especially "A Lil' Story"—are heavily reminiscent of RZA's signature sound. It was thought that RZA had produced the track because of its sound and Deck's shoutout to the producer at the beginning of the song, but Deck has confirmed it was in fact Cilvaringz, stating,

The Resident Patient'''s release comes only three years after Inspectah Deck's previous album, The Movement'', marking the shortest time period between two of the Wu rapper's solo releases; like his previous albums, it forgoes any effort at popular success and aims for a strictly underground, street feel. Unlike his two other releases, however, its sound is more cinematic, relying on strings or horns low in the mix and synthesizers, organs or piano chords for emphasis. The subject matter also differs, shifting from enlightening street narratives to gritty boasts and scattered movie or pop culture references, including "A Lil' Story" (made up of movie titles and actors' names) and even the album's title, taking the name of a Sherlock Holmes detective story (a reference in itself, to Deck being an "Inspectah").

Track listing

References 

Inspectah Deck albums
2006 mixtape albums
Albums produced by Cilvaringz